The 1975 Chicago White Sox season was the team's 75th season in Major League Baseball, and its 76th season overall. They finished with a record of 75–86, good enough for fifth place in the American League West, 22½ games behind the first-place Oakland Athletics.

Offseason 
 December 3, 1974: Dick Allen was traded by the White Sox to the Atlanta Braves for a player to be named later and cash. The Braves completed the deal by sending Jim Essian to the White Sox on May 15, 1975.
 January 2, 1975: Joe Henderson was purchased from the White Sox by the Cincinnati Reds.

Regular season 
 The proposed sale of the Chicago White Sox presented opportunities for the Oakland Athletics. A group from Seattle was ready to purchase the White Sox and move them to Seattle. As Charlie Finley had business interests in Chicago, he was prepared to move the Athletics to Chicago. Due to his 20-year lease with the city of Oakland (to expire in 1987), Finley was blocked. In the end, White Sox owner Arthur Allyn sold to Bill Veeck, who kept the White Sox in Chicago.

Season standings

Record vs. opponents

Opening Day lineup 
 Nyls Nyman, LF
 Jorge Orta, 2B
 Buddy Bradford, RF
 Deron Johnson, DH
 Ken Henderson, CF
 Bill Melton, 3B
 Bucky Dent, SS
 Carlos May, 1B
 Brian Downing, C
 Wilbur Wood, P

Notable transactions 
 May 8, 1975: Bill Sharp was traded by the White Sox to the Milwaukee Brewers for Bob Coluccio.
 June 3, 1975: Marv Foley was drafted by the White Sox in the 17th round of the 1975 Major League Baseball draft.
 June 15, 1975: Tony Muser was traded by the White Sox to the Baltimore Orioles for Jesse Jefferson.

Roster

Player stats

Batting 
Note: G = Games played; AB = At bats; R = Runs scored; H = Hits; 2B = Doubles; 3B = Triples; HR = Home runs; RBI = Runs batted in; BB = Base on balls; SO = Strikeouts; AVG = Batting average; SB = Stolen bases

Pitching 
Note: W = Wins; L = Losses; ERA = Earned run average; G = Games pitched; GS = Games started; SV = Saves; IP = Innings pitched; H = Hits allowed; R = Runs allowed; ER = Earned runs allowed; HR = Home runs allowed; BB = Walks allowed; K = Strikeouts

Farm system

Notes

References 
 
 1975 Chicago White Sox at Baseball Reference

Chicago White Sox seasons
Chicago White Sox season
Chicago